The Code of Iowa contains the statutory laws of the U.S. state of Iowa. The Iowa Legislative Service Bureau is a non-partisan governmental agency that organizes, updates, and publishes the Iowa Code. It is republished in full every odd year, and is supplemented in even years.

External reference

Iowa Code online at Iowa General Assembly.
Iowa Online Law Reference

Iowa statutes
Iowa